Jaire Zakar Alexander (born February 9, 1997) is an American football cornerback for the Green Bay Packers of the National Football League (NFL). He played college football at Louisville, and was selected by the Packers in the first round of the 2018 NFL Draft.

Early years
Alexander attended Rocky River High School in Mint Hill, North Carolina. While there, he played high school football for the Ravens. He originally committed to the University of South Carolina to play college football but changed his commitment to the University of Louisville.

College career
Alexander played at Louisville from 2015 to 2017 under head coach Bobby Petrino. During his career, he had 77 tackles and seven interceptions. For the 2016 season, he was named Second-team All-ACC. After his junior season in 2017, he decided to forgo his senior year and enter the draft. He decided not to play in the 2017 TaxSlayer Bowl with the rest of the Louisville team due to persistent injury issues during the season.

College statistics

Professional career
On December 22, 2017, Alexander announced his decision to forgo his remaining eligibility and enter the 2018 NFL Draft. As a result of his decision, he chose not to play in the TaxSlayer Bowl. He attended the NFL Scouting Combine in Indianapolis and completed all of the combine and positional drills. Among cornerbacks, Alexander finished third in the short shuttle, finished fifth in the three-cone drill, finished sixth in the 40-yard dash, and tied for fourth in the broad jump. On March 29, 2018, Alexander participated at Louisville's pro day, but opted to stand on his combine numbers and only performed positional drills. At the conclusion of the pre-draft process, Alexander was projected to be a first round pick by NFL draft experts and scouts. He was ranked as the top cornerback prospect in the draft by NFL analyst Mike Mayock and was ranked the third best cornerback by DraftScout.com.

The Green Bay Packers selected Alexander in the first round (18th overall) of the 2018 NFL Draft. The Packers traded their first (27th overall), third (76th overall), and sixth round picks (186th overall) to the Seattle Seahawks in exchange for their first (18th overall) and seventh round picks (248th overall) in order to draft Alexander 18th overall.

On May 15, 2018, the Green Bay Packers signed Alexander to a fully guaranteed four-year, $12.05 million contract that includes a signing bonus of $6.84 million.

2018

Throughout training camp, Alexander competed to be a starting cornerback against Davon House, Tramon Williams, Kevin King, and Josh Jackson. Head coach Mike McCarthy named Alexander the fourth cornerback on the depth chart to start the regular season, behind House, King, and Williams.

He made his professional regular season debut in the Green Bay Packers' season-opener against the Chicago Bears and recorded three solo tackles during their 24–23 victory. On September 16, 2018, Alexander recorded eight combined tackles and was credited with half a sack during a 29–29 tie with the Minnesota Vikings in a Week 2. During the fourth quarter, Alexander intercepted a pass by Minnesota Vikings quarterback Kirk Cousins, but the play was negated due to a roughing the passer call on teammate Clay Matthews III. On September 30, 2018, Alexander made one tackle, broke up a pass, and made his first career interception during a 22–0 win against the Buffalo Bills in Week 4. Alexander intercepted a pass attempt by Bills' quarterback Josh Allen, that was intended for wide receiver Zay Jones, during the second quarter. Alexander was inactive for two games (Weeks 5–6) due to a groin injury.

2019
In week 5 against the Dallas Cowboys, Alexander recorded his first interception of the season off Dak Prescott and returned it for 37 yards in the 34–24 win.
In week 15 against the Chicago Bears, Alexander recorded 8 tackles and intercepted a pass thrown by Mitch Trubisky during the 21–13 win.

2020
In Week 1 against the Minnesota Vikings, Alexander sacked quarterback Kirk Cousins in the endzone for a safety and later intercepted a pass thrown by Cousins during the 43–34 victory. During the 2020–21 season, he made his first Pro Bowl as a starter for the NFC. On January 8, 2021, he made the 2020 All-Pro Team second-team. He finished the 2020 season as the NFL's No. 1 cornerback as ranked by Pro Football Focus.

In the Division Playoffs versus the Los Angeles Rams, Alexander became the only cornerback since 2006 to allow negative yards in a playoff game (−3 yards).
In the NFC Championship against the Tampa Bay Buccaneers, Alexander intercepted two passes thrown by Tom Brady during the 31–26 loss.

2021
On April 26, 2021, the Packers exercised the fifth-year option on Alexander's contract, worth a guaranteed $13.3 million for the 2022 season. Alexander was placed on injured reserve on October 9, 2021, after suffering a shoulder injury in a Week 4 victory against the Pittsburgh Steelers. Packers' medical staff held off on a possible season-ending surgery to repair the sprain, and after 2 months on the IR list, the Packers designated Alexander to return to practice on December 8, 2021. He was activated on December 29. On January 2, 2022, the Packers placed Alexander on the COVID-19/Reserve list. He was activated off the list on January 7, but due to a lack of conditioning it was announced that he would miss the Packers' final regular season game against the Detroit Lions on January 9. He was officially designated as questionable to play for the Packers' Divisional Round playoff game against the San Francisco 49ers. He would play, but didn't record a stat in the 10–13 loss.

2022
On May 18, 2022, Alexander signed a four-year, $84 million contract extension with the Packers through the 2026 season. In December, he was named to the 2023 Pro Bowl.

NFL career statistics

Regular season

Postseason

References

External links
Green Bay Packers bio
Louisville Cardinals bio

1997 births
Living people
American football cornerbacks
Louisville Cardinals football players
Green Bay Packers players
National Conference Pro Bowl players
Players of American football from Philadelphia